Thank You for Being a Friend: The Best of Andrew Gold is a compilation album by singer-songwriter Andrew Gold released in 1997 by Rhino Records.

Overview
The album consists of seventeen songs from Gold's first four Asylum Records studio albums, including hits "Lonely Boy" and "Thank You for Being a Friend", the previously unreleased track "The Final Frontier", the theme from the NBC series Mad About You, and two tracks, "Can Anybody See You" and "The King of Showbiz", taken from 1996 album ...Since 1951 (the liner notes incorrectly state that they are as well previously unreleased).

Track listing 
All songs written by Andrew Gold, except where noted.

References

1997 compilation albums
Andrew Gold albums
albums produced by Andrew Gold
albums produced by Peter Asher
albums produced by Chuck Plotkin
albums produced by Don Was
albums produced by Graham Gouldman
Rhino Records compilation albums